Pablo Javier Bengoechea Dutra (born 27 June 1965) is a Uruguayan former professional footballer, who is currently a manager. A midfielder of exquisite technique, he played for several clubs in Uruguay and Spain. He was the captain of the club C.A. Peñarol and the Uruguay national team. He also played at the 1990 World Cup. He is known by the nicknames of "the Professor" and "the Ten".

Club career
Bengoechea, a native of Rivera, started his career at the Oriental Atlético Club of Rivera. He later played for Montevideo Wanderers, Sevilla FC of Spain, Gimnasia y Esgrima La Plata of Argentina and C.A. Peñarol.

Peñarol
Bengoechea's career at Peñarol was very successful in terms of titles won. He helped the team conquer the second “Quinquenio de Oro” (five consecutive league titles), winning the league title in the seasons of 1993, 1994, 1995, 1996, 1997. He also won titles in 1999 and 2003, the 1997 Liguilla, and two Parmalat championships in 1993 and 1994.

National team
He represented the Uruguay national team from 1986 to 1997. He played in the Copa Americas of 1987 and 1995. He scored in the final of both the 1987 and 1995 Copas América, as Uruguay won the titles against Chile and Brazil, respectively. He played in Uruguay's loss at the 1990 World Cup against Belgium, coming in as a substitute and scoring the team's only goal of the match.

After retirement
During the 2007–2008 season, along his friend Markarian he was part of the technical staff of CA Cruz Azul from Mexico.
To honor his accomplishments at Penarol, a monument in the Aromos was erected. Hundreds of manyas were present the day of the inauguration.
In 2009, he signed a contract with Chilean giants Universidad de Chile, as Assistant Manager, being Sergio Markarian the first team coach. In 2010, he became the assistant manager of Sergio Markarian as he became the new coach of the Peru national football team. On March 4, 2014, Bengoechea was named the manager of the Peru national team.

Career statistics

International

References

External links

 Article on Pablo Bengoechea from zonacharrua.com
 
 Pablo Bengoechea at Footballdatabase

Uruguayan footballers
Peñarol players
Montevideo Wanderers F.C. players
Club de Gimnasia y Esgrima La Plata footballers
Expatriate footballers in Argentina
Sevilla FC players
Uruguayan Primera División players
La Liga players
Argentine Primera División players
Uruguay international footballers
1990 FIFA World Cup players
1987 Copa América players
1989 Copa América players
1995 Copa América players
Association football midfielders
River Plate Montevideo managers
1965 births
Living people
People from Rivera Department
Uruguayan people of Basque descent
Peru national football team managers
Peñarol managers
Copa América-winning players
Uruguayan Primera División managers
Uruguayan football managers